The 1958 Denver Pioneers football team was an American football team that represented the University of Denver as a member of the Skyline Conference during the 1958 NCAA University Division football season. In their fourth season under head coach John Roning, the Pioneers compiled a 2–8 record (2–5 against conference opponents), tied for sixth place in the Skyline, and were outscored by a total of 163 to 135.

Schedule

References

Denver
Denver Pioneers football seasons
Denver Pioneers football